Bram Snepvangers (born 1976) is a Dutch Magic: The Gathering player. He is now considered retired, but has been on and off the Pro Tour for twelve years. In addition to his success playing Magic, he is known as a community builder both as a judge and a tournament organiser. Each year he hosts an invitational tournament for Dutch players called Bramvitational. Along with Willam "Huey" Jensen and Brad Nelson, Snepvangers is one of only three players to have eliminated Kai Budde in the knock-rounds of a Pro Tour. He qualified for every Pro Tour event held in the decade of the 2000s, and participated in all but one of them. He is second only to Raphaël Lévy on the list of players with the most Pro Tour appearances.

In 2010, Snepvangers was voted into the Hall of Fame, alongside Gabriel Nassif and Brian Kibler. The Dutchman passed the 40% threshold necessary to become a Hall of Famer by a single vote.  Snepvangers was not originally announced as an inductee, but it was later discovered that Wizards of the Coast had not used the proper formula to calculate his voting total.

Achievements

Hall of Fame class of 2010

References

1976 births
Living people
Dutch Magic: The Gathering players
People from Houten
Sportspeople from Utrecht (province)